The Central Committee of the League of Communists of Yugoslavia (Централни комитет Савеза комуниста Југославије) was the highest body of the League of Communists of Yugoslavia between Congresses.

In the latter phase of the Socialist Federal Republic of Yugoslavia, the central committee was composed of 110 to 120 members elected by the individual republic and provincial communist parties.

References

Bibliography
 
 

League of Communists of Yugoslavia
Yugoslavia, League of Communists